The chupalla is a traditional Chilean horseman's hat made of straw. Many people in rural areas of Central Chile use it as well. In addition, it is often used when dancing the cueca (a Chilean folk dance) and during Chilean rodeos.  
 
The name chupalla comes from achupalla, a local name given to a bromelia plant that was used to make these hats. Today, chupallas are made of various types of straw, including rice and wheat. 

The phrase "por la chupalla" may be heard frequently in Chile.  It is an interjection which, loosely translated, means "what the heck!".

The chupalla has a flat top and a perfectly circular rim.

References

Hats
Rider apparel
Chilean culture
Chilean clothing
Rodeo in Chile